Yordan Hristov Miliev (born 5 October 1987) is a Bulgarian footballer who currently plays as a defender.

Biography
Miliev's uncle, Ivan, was a professional footballer with the local outfit PFC Lokomotiv Plovdiv. As a youngster, Yordan supported Lokomotiv Plovdiv. Outside of football, he lists his hobbies as watching films and Formula One. Miliev is a big fan of the motoring. He also enjoys reading adventure stories.

Career

Lokomotiv Plovdiv
Born in the small town of Peshtera, Miliev started his career in the private football school "Apoli'99" in Plovdiv.
In June 2006, he signed his first professional contract with Lokomotiv Plovdiv. His first match for the team was against Farul Constanța in the UEFA Intertoto Cup tournament. He quickly became a key figure for Lokomotiv team, as he was considered to be highly talented and reliable in the center of the defense.

Levski Sofia
On 9 January Miliev officially signed a 2.5-year contract with Levski Sofia. He became the first signing for Levski in January. He has been given the kit number 55. He chose it, because his lucky number is 5, and he wants more than just luck, so he chose 55.

Miliev made his unofficial debut for Levski in a friendly match against Red Star Belgrade. He played 45 minutes, and Levski won the match. He eventually debut for Levski on 4 March in a match against PFC Vihren Sandanski. Levski won the match and the result was 2:0. He became a Champion of Bulgaria in 2009.

Miliev made his debut in Europe on 21 July 2009 in the second match of the 2nd Qualifying round of UEFA Champions League, where Levski beaten the team of UE Sant Julià. The result of the match was 0:5 with a guest win for Levski. He scored his first goal for Levski on 8 August 2009 against Botev Plovdiv. The result of the match was 5:0 with a home win for Levski.

In 2009/2010 season Levski achieved qualifying for UEFA Europa League becoming 3rd in the final ranking. During the 2010/2011 Levski qualified for UEFA Europa League after eliminating Dundalk F.C., Kalmar FF and AIK Fotboll. Levski was drawn in Group C, facing Gent, Lille and Sporting CP.

Prior to the start of the 2012/2013 A PFG season Miliev was loaned out to Israeli club Ironi Ramat HaSharon, but in late November 2012 he returned to Levski in part due to the tense security situation in Israel. During the 2013/2014 A PFG season, Miliev was mostly confined to substitute appearances and he joined Shkëndija from neighbouring Macedonia in January 2014.

International career

He has featured for the Bulgaria U21 national side. Miliev earned his first cap for Bulgaria on 3 March 2010 in the 0:2 away loss against Poland in a friendly match.

In 2018 Miliev was part of the Bulgarian minifootball national team in the 2018 Cape Town World Cup finishing as runner-up.

Career Stats
As of 15 January 2014.

Awards
 Champion of Bulgaria 2009
 Bulgarian Supercup 2009

References

External links
 Miliev at Levski's official site
 Yordan Miliev at LEVSKI2000
 Profile at LevskiSofia.info

1987 births
Living people
Bulgarian footballers
PFC Lokomotiv Plovdiv players
PFC Levski Sofia players
Hapoel Nir Ramat HaSharon F.C. players
KF Shkëndija players
First Professional Football League (Bulgaria) players
Israeli Premier League players
Expatriate footballers in Israel
Expatriate footballers in North Macedonia
Bulgarian expatriate sportspeople in Israel
Association football central defenders